Eulophophyllum is a genus of leaf mimicking bush crickets or katydids in the subfamily Phaneropterinae. It was originally circumscribed in 1922 by Morgan Hebard as a monospecific genus for the species E. thaumasium, but two new species were described and added to the genus in 2016.

Species
The type species E. thaumasi was found originally in Labuan island, with the other species recorded from Sabah; E. lobulatum appears to be endemic to Mount Kinabalu where there is National Park protection.  The Orthoptera Species File currently lists:
Eulophophyllum thaumasium Hebard, 1922
Eulophophyllum lobulatum Ingrisch & Riede, 2016
Eulophophyllum kirki Ingrisch & Riede, 2016

References

Tettigoniidae genera
Insects of Malaysia
Phaneropterinae
Orthoptera of Asia